Eulithosia is a genus of moths of the family Noctuidae erected by Henry Edwards in 1884.

Taxonomy
The Global Lepidoptera Names Index gives this name as a synonym of Antaplaga Grote, 1877 and Butterflies and Moths of the World gives it as a synonym of Cirrhophanus Grote, 1972.

Species
Eulithosia composita H. Edwards, 1884 Arizona, western Texas
Eulithosia discistriga (Smith, 1903) California, Arizona, western Texas, southern Nevada, southern California, northern Baja California
Eulithosia plesioglauca (Dyar, 1912) Mexico, Arizona
Eulithosia papago (Barnes, 1907) southern New Mexico
Eulithosia miaiphona (Dyar, 1912) Mexico

References

Hadeninae